Gillian Murphy (born April 11, 1979) is an American ballet dancer who is a principal dancer with the American Ballet Theatre.

Early life and education
Raised in Florence, South Carolina, Murphy was a member of Columbia City Ballet before attending high school at University of North Carolina School of the Arts. There, under the tutelage of Melissa Hayden, she danced principal roles in several of the school's productions, including The Nutcracker and George Balanchine’s Concerto Barocco, Western Symphony, Tarantella and Theme and Variations.

Career
Following her graduation from high school, Murphy joined American Ballet Theatre's corps de ballet in August 1996 at the age of 17. She was promoted to soloist in 1998. In 2001, her debut as Odette/Odile in Swan Lake garnered rave reviews from The New York Times. The following year she was promoted to principal dancer. That same year she was named one of Dance Magazine's 25 To Watch by Gus Solomon Jr.

Murphy has performed as a guest artist with Mariinsky Ballet, Royal Swedish Ballet, Staatsballett Berlin, Kiev Ballet, and The Australian Ballet. She spent 3 years as a Guest Principal with Royal New Zealand Ballet, during her husband's tenure as the company's director.

Murphy celebrated her 20th anniversary with ABT on May 28, 2016, with a performance of La Fille mal gardée.

Selected repertoire
Murphy's repertory with the American Ballet Theatre includes:
{{columns-list|colwidth=20em|
Nikiya and Gamzatti in La Bayadère
The Ballerina in The Bright Stream
Cinderella in Frederick Ashton’s Cinderella
Cinderella in James Kudelka’s Cinderella
Swanilda in Coppélia
Medora and Gulnare in Le Corsaire 
Kitri in Don Quixote
Titania in The Dream
The second girl in Fancy Free
Lise in La Fille mal gardée
The Flames of Paris pas de deux  
Grand Pas Classique 
Giselle and Myrta in Giselle
Manon in Lady of the Camellias
Lescaut’s Mistress in Manon
The Sugar Plum Fairy in Kevin McKenzie’s The NutcrackerOther DancesThe titular role in RaymondaJuliet in Romeo and JulietPrincess Aurora in Ratmansky’s The Sleeping BeautyPrincess Aurora and the Lilac Fairy in The Sleeping BeautyOdette-Odile in Swan Lake 
The titular role in Sylvia 
The first and third movements in Symphony in CTschaikovsky Pas de DeuxThe ballerina in Theme and Variations 
Princess Tea Flower in Whipped CreamBach PartitaLes PatineursPiano Concerto #1Les SylphidesCreated roles
Pierrette in Alexei Ratmansky’s HarlequinadeClara, the Princess in Ratmansky’s The NutcrackerLeading roles in Her NotesKaleidoscopeRabbit and Rogue Thirteen DiversionsAfter YouDream within a Dream (deferred)Glow – StopOne of ThreePraedicereWithin You Without You: A Tribute to George Harrison}}

Awards
 Awarded the Prix de Lausanne Espoir (1995)
 Presidential Scholar nominee (1996)
 Awarded a Dance Fellowship by the Princess Grace Foundation (1998)
 Received the Princess Grace Statue Award (2009)
Honorary Doctorate, University of North Carolina School of the Arts

Television and movie appearances
In 2000, she had a small part in the film Center Stage, which featured her ABT colleagues Ethan Stiefel, Julie Kent, and Sascha Radetsky in starring roles.  She also appeared in the film's sequel, Center Stage: Turn It Up. In 2005 she performed  the dual role, Odette and Odile, in Kevin McKenzie's version of Swan Lake with ABT. This performance was filmed and broadcast as a part of Great Performances: Dance in America on PBS. In 2010 she appeared as herself in season 4, episode 8 of Gossip Girl with Ethan Stiefel.  She also appears as the eponymous character in Royal New Zealand Ballet's documentary and filmed production of Giselle. Behind the scenes, she served as a ballet consultant on the movie Black Swan''.

Personal life
On September 19, 2015, Murphy married her longtime partner Ethan Stiefel, a former principal dancer with American Ballet Theatre and New York City Ballet. Stiefel proposed to her following her performance in the opening night gala of American Ballet Theatre's 2011 season. On December 14, 2018, Murphy announced that she was pregnant with their first child and would take maternity leave for the 2018-2019 season. In June 2019, Murphy announced the birth of her first child,  Ax Nathaniel Stiefel.

Murphy graduated from St. Mary's College in 2018. She completed the Crossover to Business program for professional artists and athletes at Harvard Business School.

References

External links
 
 Gillian Murphy at American Ballet Theatre
 

1979 births
Living people
American ballerinas
Prima ballerinas
American Ballet Theatre principal dancers
Princess Grace Awards winners
Prix de Lausanne winners
21st-century American ballet dancers
Saint Mary's College of California alumni
Dancers from North Carolina
People from Florence, South Carolina
21st-century American women